Cadillac High School (also referred to as Cadillac Senior High School) is a high school in Cadillac, Michigan, United States. It is one of eight schools in the Cadillac Area Public Schools  (CAPS) school district.

History

Clam Lake Public School opened in early 1873, with 35 enrollees, and a high school unit was added in 1877.
The brick Cadillac High School building was erected on the site in 1891.

1975 Homecoming game 
In October 1975, rock group Kiss visited Cadillac and performed at the Cadillac High School gymnasium. They played the concert to honor the school's football team. In previous years, the team had compiled a record of sixteen consecutive victories, but the 1974 squad opened the season with two losses. The assistant coach, Jim Neff, an English teacher and rock'n'roll fan, thought to inspire the team by playing Kiss music in the locker room. He also connected the team's game plan, K-I-S-S or "Keep It Simple Stupid", with the band. The team went on to win seven straight games and their conference co-championship. After learning of their association with the team's success, the band decided to visit the school and play for the homecoming game against the Chippewa Hills Warriors. Cadillac won the rest of the games that season.

Demographics 
The demographic breakdown of the 851 students enrolled in 2018-19 was:

 Male - 47.1%
 Female - 52.9%
 Native American - 0.2%
 Asian - 0.9%
 Black - 0.6%
 Hispanic - 2.5%
 Native Hawaiian/Pacific Islander - 0.4%
 White - 93.8%
 Multiracial - 1.6%

In addition, 44.3% of students were eligible for reduced-price or free lunch.

Academics

In 2015, U.S. News ranked Cadillac High School #949 it in its list of "America's Best High Schools".

Athletics
Cadillac's athletic teams are the Vikings. Sports include football, volleyball, cross country, soccer, tennis, basketball, track, softball, skiing, cheerleading, ice hockey, bowling and girls' swimming.

Notable alumni
Paul McMullen (1972–2021), middle distance runner, Olympian
Jackie Swanson (b. 1963), actress
Guy Vander Jagt (1931–2007), U.S. congressman
Bert Zagers (1933–1992), former American football player in the National Football League

Notes

External links
Official website

Public high schools in Michigan
Education in Wexford County, Michigan
1877 establishments in Michigan